The Changsha IRD Building Bombings (Chinese language: 長沙稅務分局大樓爆炸事件) occurred on July 30, 2010 at about 4:15pm, and resulted in four deaths and 19 injuries. The site of the blasts was the third floor of the Dongtundu Inland Revenue Department Branch Building in Furong District, Changsha, Hunan, China.

Police announced that the explosion was deliberate. The bomb  exploded under a conference table, and killed two people and seriously injured ten others on the spot; two among the wounded died after being taken to the hospital.

References

External links

2010 murders in China
Mass murder in 2010
Improvised explosive device bombings in China
July 2010 crimes
History of Changsha
21st-century mass murder in China
Building bombings in Asia